AUU may refer to:

 an abbreviation for Adelaide University Union
 AUU, a codon for the amino acid isoleucine
 Aurukun Airport, IATA airport code "AUU"